Sullivan is an unincorporated community in Randolph County, West Virginia, United States.

References

Unincorporated communities in Randolph County, West Virginia
Unincorporated communities in West Virginia